Family Affair was the first television serial. It was broadcast by BBC Television in six episodes from 1949–1950.

Among the actors who appeared in this comedy series are Daphne Oxenford,  Heather Chasen and Michael Shepley. Chasen and Shepley had minor roles.

The episodes of Family Affairs are lost broadcasts; no recordings are known to remain.

See also
 List of lost television broadcasts
 List of lost television broadcasts in the United Kingdom

References

1940s British comedy television series
1949 British television series debuts
1950 British television series endings
Lost BBC episodes